The 2MV planetary probe (short for 2nd generation Mars-Venus) is a designation for a common design used by early Soviet unmanned probes to Mars and Venus. It was an incremental improvement of earlier 1MV probes and was used for the Venera 5 and Venera 6 missions to Venus. It was standard practice of the Soviet space program to use standardized components as much as possible. All probes shared the same general characteristics and differed only in equipment necessary for specific missions. Each probe also incorporated improvements based on experience with earlier missions.
It was superseded by the 3MV family.

Design 
The probe consisted of three primary parts.

Orbital Compartment
The core of the stack was a pressurized compartment called the Orbital Compartment measuring 2.1 meters with a diameter of 1.1 meters.
Also mounted on the Orbital Compartment was a parabolic high-gain antenna, used for long-range communications.

Payloads
Depending on the mission, the probe would carry specific instruments or a detachable landing module.

Engine
Course correction capabilities were provided by a KDU-414 engine attached to the top of the Orbital Compartment.

Variants
2MV-1: Venera 2MV-1 No.1 (Sputnik 19), Venera 2MV-1 No.2 (Sputnik 20)
2MV-2: Venera 2MV-2 No.1 (Sputnik 21)
2MV-4: Mars 2MV-4 No.1 (Sputnik 22), Mars 1 (Mars 2MV-4 or Sputnik 21)
2MV-3: Mars 2MV-3 No.1 (Sputnik 24)
2V (V-69): Venera 5 (2V (V-69) No.330), Venera 6 (2V (V-69) No.331)

See also 
 Soviet space program
 Venera
 1MV

References 

 
Soviet Mars missions
Soviet Venus missions
Soviet space probes